The Taipei Economic and Cultural Office in Australia (TECO) represents interests of Taiwan in Australia in the absence of formal diplomatic relations, functioning as a de facto embassy.

The Office is headed by a Representative, currently Elliott Charng.

Its head office is in Canberra, but it also has branch offices in Sydney, Melbourne and Brisbane.

It was established in 1988 as the "Taiwan Marketing Service" office, before becoming the "Taipei Economic and Cultural Office" in 1991, along with the "Far East Trading Company" offices in Sydney and Melbourne, established in 1979. An unofficial organisation known as the Australia-Free China Society, headed by New South Wales MP Douglas Darby, also represented Taiwan in Australia from 1974.

It is counterpart in Taiwan is the Australian Office in Taipei, formerly the Australian Commerce and Industry Office.

Organizational structures
 Public Affairs Division
 Cultural Division
 Economic Division
 Information Division
 Science and Technology Division

List of representatives
 Timothy Yang (2000–2005)
 
 Katharine Chang (December 2011 – 31 December 2014)
 David Lee (1 January 2015 –  ?)
 William Lin (acting) ( ? - October 2016)
 Elliott Charng (October 2016 –)

See also
 Australia–Taiwan relations

References

External links
 Taipei Economic and Cultural Office in Australia

Australia
Taiwan
1988 establishments in Australia
Diplomatic missions in Canberra
Organizations established in 1988
Australia–Taiwan relations